Glenn Helder (born 28 October 1968) is a Dutch former professional footballer who played as a winger.  

He notably played in the Premier League for Arsenal, in the Eredivisie for Sparta Rotterdam, Vitesse Arnhem and NAC Breda. He also played in Portugal for Benfica, in China with Dalian Wanda FC and in Hungary with MTK Hungária FC before finishing his career back in the Netherlands with RBC Roosendaal, TOP Oss and DOTO. He was capped four times by the Netherlands.

Since retirement, he has played as a professional Poker player, a musician, a welder and a stand up comedian.

Playing career 
Born in Leiden, Helder played for Sparta Rotterdam and Vitesse Arnhem of the Eredivisie before joining Arsenal on 14 February 1995. He made his debut for Arsenal in a 1–0 home win against Nottingham Forest on 21 February 1995. Helder was the final signing made by Arsenal's then manager George Graham, who left a week after Helder's arrival. Helder made 27 league appearances for Arsenal, plus 12 as a substitute, and scored a solo goal for the club in a 3–2 win over Middlesbrough. In late 1996, just after the appointment of Arsène Wenger as manager, Arsenal sent Helder on loan to Benfica where he sustained a serious injury. On his return, Helder found that he had been replaced by Marc Overmars, who signed for Arsenal in the summer of 1997. Helder was unable to break back into the first team.

Helder then moved to NAC Breda in his native Netherlands and, after a short spell there, he went to play in China for Dalian Wanda FC. Soon afterwards he returned to Breda for a second spell at the club before moving on to MTK Hungária FC of Hungary. He then returned home to trial with FC Dordrecht, which proved to be unfruitful. Helder eventually signed for RBC Roosendaal in 2000 and two years later moved to TOP Oss. He retired one year later. In July 2006, Helder made a surprise appearance for Arsenal in Dennis Bergkamp's final game, a testimonial against Ajax. Helder appears regularly in Masters footballing tournaments and soccer clinics.

International career
In his Dutch international footballing career, Helder earned four caps altogether for the Oranje.

Personal life 
In a 1999 interview, Helder stated that during his stay at NAC he tried to commit suicide because of problems resulting from compulsive gambling. However, he continues to gamble, and is sometimes seen playing poker on the English Five television station, representing the Netherlands, most notably in the PartyPoker.com Football & Poker Legends Cup.

After his retirement from professional football, Helder took up music, gaining recognition as a percussionist. He also became a stand up comedian.

References 

1968 births
Arsenal F.C. players
S.L. Benfica footballers
Dalian Shide F.C. players
Expatriate footballers in England
Dutch footballers
Living people
MTK Budapest FC players
NAC Breda players
TOP Oss players
Netherlands international footballers
Expatriate footballers in China
Expatriate footballers in Portugal
Expatriate footballers in Hungary
Dutch expatriate sportspeople in Portugal
Dutch expatriate footballers
Dutch sportspeople of Surinamese descent
Footballers from Leiden
Primeira Liga players
Eredivisie players
Premier League players
Nemzeti Bajnokság I players
Sparta Rotterdam players
SBV Vitesse players
Dutch expatriate sportspeople in China
RBC Roosendaal players
Association football midfielders